Dry Creek is a stream in Webster County in the Ozarks of southern Missouri. It is a tributary of the James River.

The stream source area is just northwest of Diggins and it flows generally northwest to join the James just east of the village of Crown.

Dry Creek was so named for the fact it often runs dry.

See also
List of rivers of Missouri

References

Rivers of Webster County, Missouri
Rivers of Missouri